Sparganothina flammea is a species of moth of the family Tortricidae. It is found in Costa Rica.

The length of the forewings is 7.4-7.6 mm for males and 10 mm for females. The forewings are golden yellow with chestnut-brown markings bordered by an orange-brown line of scales and with scattered orange-brown scales. The hindwings are white to pale golden.

Etymology
The species name refers to the colour of the species and is derived from Latin flammeus (meaning flame, fire)

References

Moths described in 2001
Sparganothini